Tomáš Abrahám (born 18 April 1979) is a Czech former football player who last played professionally for Wacker Innsbruck as a defensive midfielder.

Career

Club career
Abrahám played in his youth for Sokol Hrotovice and FC Slavia Trebic. With 16 years changed the defensive midfielder for FC Zbrojovka Brno, where he made his debut in the 1998/99 season the first team. The following season he was loaned to the third division side FK Poštorná. Then he returned to Brno, but made only one game in the season 2000/01. He was loaned to the Slovak First League side FK AS Trenčín, where he played only twice
Mid-2002, Abraham returned to Brno, where he could ultimately prevail. In two years, he missed only one league game. In 2004, he was hired by the Turkish Süper Lig side Denizlispor, where he is one of the mainstays of the team.
In early February 2009 moved on loan to the Greek first division Abrahám Skoda Xanthi, after he had previously refused his contract ending in June 2009 to June 2009 verlängern. Im Abrahám moved to the Czech first division first climber 1. FC Slovácko. There he played 22 times and scored one goal. After a year he left and moved to the upstart Austrian Bundesliga promoted Wacker Innsbruck

External links
 
 Profile at 1. FC Slovácko website 

1979 births
Living people
Czech footballers
Czech expatriate footballers
1. FC Slovácko players
FC Zbrojovka Brno players
Denizlispor footballers
FC Wacker Innsbruck (2002) players
Czech First League players
Süper Lig players
Super League Greece players
Austrian Football Bundesliga players
Expatriate footballers in Turkey
Czech expatriate sportspeople in Turkey
Expatriate footballers in Greece
Expatriate footballers in Austria
Czech expatriate sportspeople in Austria
Sportspeople from Třebíč
Association football midfielders
Czech expatriate sportspeople in Greece